Asota borbonica is a moth of the family Erebidae. It is found in Africa, including South Africa, Mauritius, Réunion and Madagascar.

References

External links 
 Species info

Asota (moth)
Moths of the Comoros
Moths of Madagascar
Moths of Mauritius
Moths of Réunion
Moths described in 1833
Moths of Africa